Hulagabali  is a village in the southern state of Karnataka, India. It is located in the Athani taluk toward north-east of Belgaum district. The basic occupation in Hulagabali is agriculture and there are also many landlords in the village who are famous in agriculture. Sugarcane is the highest percentage of agriculture as per the survey. There are quite a few temples in the village. The Birappa temple located in this village is well known in surrounding villages. Birappa temple has a large fair and festivities twice a year that draws huge crowd in the region. Sri Sangameshwara temple stands at the juncture of River Krishna and River Agrani. The famous landlords are Patil (Gouda).

Famous landlords
Desai
Patil

Demographics
At the 2001 India census, Hulagabali had a population of 7446 with 3863 males and 3583 females.

See also
 Belgaum
 Districts of Karnataka

References

External links
 belgaum.nic.in

Temple of village

Shree Bhirasiddeshwara : Lord Bhirasiddeshra temple is very powerful and holy place, every 12 year there will be big jatra pallakki mohostva will be celebrating by near by all villages.people of this village believes that Shree bhirasaddeshra never go out of this village.

Villages in Belagavi district